Oru Kochu Swapnam is a 1984 Indian Malayalam-language family drama film directed and shot by Vipin Das and written by Joseph Madappally. The film stars Mohanlal, Ilavarasi, Nedumudi Venu, Seema, and Unnimary. The film score was composed by M. B. Sreenivasan. The story is about a teenage girl lacking proper sex education exploring her sexuality.

Plot
Sulu and her younger sister Sindhu has no family and lives alone by their own. Sulu is a co-operative bank employee and Sindhu is a school-going teenager. Sulu is in a secret romantic relationship with her co-worker in the bank, Venu. Sulu is several years elder than Sindhu, so she treats her as a child as if they were mother and daughter. Sulu is concerned about Sindhu's growth, she advises her to limit her physical interaction with boys, Sindhu becomes ambivalent. As their life goes on, Sindhu reaches menarche, despite knowing that she has reached puberty, other than being overprotective, Sulu is too embarrassed to give her proper sex education.

One day, Sindhu finds out about the relationship between Sulu and Venu by chance. Sulu is embarrassed. Sulu and Venu decide to make their relationship public, they marries at a short ceremony and moves to Venu's house, taking along Sindhu with them. Sindhu has good results in her higher secondary exams and has now admitted to a college. Sindhu's neighbour Jaya also studies in their college and she has had multiple romantic relationship with boys. Jaya teaches her more about romantic relationships with opposite-sex, at one time, she also hands her over an adult pornographic magazine.

Sulu reduces her over-caring for Sindhu and spares more time for spending time with Venu. Sindhu begins to feel it, one day, they have an open confrontation regarding that, while having dinner, Sulu scolds her for depending on her for serving her food. Sindhu gradually cope up with the new situation. Meanwhile, she becomes increasingly curious about male-female intimacy of her age groups as well as sexual relationship of her sister and brother-in-law. Sulu and Venu have caught her at multiple occasions for eavesdropping and voyeurism when they were having their husband and wife moments. Finally, they decides to move her to a hostel near her college.

Cast
 Mohanlal as Gilbert, a video shop owner
 Ilavarasi as Sindhu, Sulu's sister
 Nedumudi Venu as Venugopal / Venu, co-operative bank employee
 Seema as Sulu, Co-operative bank employee
 Unnimary as Sophia, Sindhu's roommate
 Ravi Menon as Damu, hostel gate keeper
 Lalithasree as Sreedevi, house maid
 Achankunju as Rickshawaala
 Kottayam Santha as Hostel matron
 Janardhanan as Co-operative bank manager
 Sabitha Anand as Maggie, video shop staff (bit part)

Soundtrack
The music was composed by M. B. Sreenivasan with lyrics by O. N. V. Kurup.

References

External links
 

1984 films
1980s Malayalam-language films
Indian coming-of-age drama films
Films scored by M. B. Sreenivasan
Casual sex in films